William Frederick Llewellyn Reese (5 April 1919 – 22 September 1982) was an Australian politician.

He was born at Hamilton, Victoria, to schoolteachers William Reese and Euphemia Clark. He attended a variety of state schools before becoming an accountant, practising from 1937. From 1939 to 1942 he served in the 8th Battalion seconded to the Supply Department. On 19 December 1942, he married Mavis Jean Clark, with whom he had a daughter. From 1952, he was a director of Car Parts Sales Pty Ltd. A member of the Liberal Party, he was elected to the Victorian Legislative Assembly for Moorabbin in 1967. He transferred to Heatherton in 1976, but was defeated in 1979. Reese died, aged 63, at Moorabbin, Melbourne, in 1982.

References

 

1919 births
1982 deaths
Liberal Party of Australia members of the Parliament of Victoria
Members of the Victorian Legislative Assembly
20th-century Australian politicians
People from Hamilton, Victoria